The Thruway Cup is an annual competition between Minor League Baseball's Buffalo Bisons, Rochester Red Wings, and Syracuse Mets of the International League. The Cup standings are compiled from the games the teams play against each other through the course of the regular season. The team at the top of the standings at the end of the season is crowned the Thruway Cup champion and wins the Thruway Cup trophy. Unique to this competition, it was agreed that any team winning the trophy three times would get to "retire" the cup and keep it as their own. As of the end of the 2021 season, Rochester has won ten times, Buffalo nine times, and Syracuse four times.

The I-90 Thruway Series is the name given to all the games played between the Bisons, Red Wings, and Mets. The series became official when the Bisons joined the International League in 1998 after moving from the Triple-A American Association. The rivalry  continued following a move to the Triple-A East in 2021, which rebranded as the International League in 2022.

All of the teams are located in cities along the New York State toll road. Syracuse and Buffalo, which are at the furthest ends are about 150 minutes' driving time from each other, while the other cities are within 90 minutes of each other.

During the 2012 season, an additional IL team made its home along the Thruway, the Empire State Yankees. The Yankees had no home ballpark, so they played their home games at the stadiums of Rochester, Syracuse, Buffalo, and the Batavia Muckdogs (formerly a Class A Short Season team located between Buffalo and Rochester); it was nevertheless not included in the Thruway Cup.

In 2017, the Rochester Red Wings earned the right to keep their retired Thruway Cup trophy, making it the first time a team retired a Cup bearing no other team's name.

No champion was awarded for the 2020 season due to the minor league season being postponed and eventually cancelled on June 30, due to the ongoing COVID-19 pandemic.

For the 2021 season, the Buffalo Bisons temporarily relocated to Trenton, New Jersey, where they played their home games at Trenton Thunder Ballpark. The Bisons' parent club, the Toronto Blue Jays, used Sahlen Field in Buffalo since the 2020 MLB season due to border restrictions brought on by the COVID-19 pandemic. This marked the first time in the history of the rivalry where one of the three teams did not play at its home ballpark along the I-90 Thruway. Buffalo played the season through July in Trenton and moved back to Buffalo in August of that season.

Winners

1998: Rochester Red Wings
1999: Syracuse SkyChiefs
2000: Buffalo Bisons
2001: Buffalo Bisons
2002: Buffalo Bisons†
2003: Rochester Red Wings
2004: Buffalo Bisons
2005: Rochester Red Wings
2006: Buffalo Bisons
2007: Buffalo Bisons†
2008: Rochester Red Wings
2009: Rochester Red Wings
2010: Syracuse Chiefs
2011: Syracuse Chiefs
2012: Buffalo Bisons
2013: Buffalo Bisons
2014: Syracuse Chiefs†
2015: Rochester Red Wings
2016: Rochester Red Wings
2017: Rochester Red Wings†
2018: Rochester Red Wings
2019: Rochester Red Wings
2020: No champion awarded (COVID-19 pandemic)
2021: Buffalo Bisons

†Team won their third Series and is allowed to keep the Thruway Cup

2009

x - Clinched the 2009 Thruway Cup
Rochester won head to head series with Syracuse nine games to seven

2010

x - Clinched the 2010 Thruway Cup

On August 30, the Chiefs beat the Bisons 4–1 in 10 innings to claim their second Thruway Cup and first since 1999.

2011

x- Clinched the 2011 Thruway Cup

2012

x- Clinched the 2012 Thruway Cup

2013

x- Clinched the 2013 Thruway Cup

On August 29, the Bisons defeated the Rochester Red Wings, 3–2 to clinch the 2013 Thruway Cup.

2014

x- Clinched the 2014 Thruway Cup

On August 31, 2014, the Syracuse Chiefs defeated the Buffalo Bisons, 4–3 to clinch the 2014 Thruway Cup, and claim their fourth Thruway Cup series and first trophy.

2015

x- Clinched the 2015 Thruway Cup

2016

x- Clinched the 2016 Thruway Cup

2017

x- Clinched the 2017 Thruway Cup Series and retired the Thruway Cup.

2018

x - Clinched the 2018 Thruway Cup

2019

x - Clinched the 2019 Thruway Cup

2021

x - Clinched the 2021 Thruway Cup

Notable players who played for all three teams
Jeff Manto Red Wings 1994; SkyChiefs 1997; Bisons 1997–2000. He won the International League Most Valuable Player Award as a member of the Red Wings in 1994. Manto's  number 30 is retired by the Bisons, and he was inducted into the International League Hall of Fame in 2014.
Darin Mastroianni Red Wings 2012–2014, 2016; Bisons 2014; Chiefs 2015
Matt Hague Bisons 2014–15; Red Wings 2017; Chiefs 2018. He won the International League Most Valuable Player Award as a member of the Bisons in 2015.
Tommy Milone Chiefs 2011, 2018; Red Wings 2014–2016; Bisons 2021
P. J. Walters Red Wings 2012–13; Bisons 2014; Chiefs 2015
Michael O'Connor Chiefs 2009, Bisons 2010–2011, Red Wings 2013

See also 
 Governors' Cup

References

External links
2009 Thruway Cup Standings, Scores, and Schedule
2010 Thruway Cup Standings, Scores, and Schedule
2011 Thruway Cup Standings, Scores, and Schedule
2012 Thruway Cup Standings, Scores, and Schedule
2016 Thruway Cup Standings, Scores, and Schedule
2018 Thruway Cup Standings, Scores, and Schedule for Rochester

Syracuse Mets
Rochester Red Wings
Buffalo Bisons (minor league)
International League trophies and awards
Upstate New York
Sports rivalries in the United States